Club Baloncesto Zamora, also known as Aquimisa Laboratorios for sponsorship reasons, is a basketball club based in Zamora, Castile and León that currently plays in LEB Plata, the third tier of Spanish basketball.

History
Founded in 1978, CB Zamora was promoted for the first time to the second tier in 1992.

CB Zamora was the only club to have played all Liga EBA seasons until 2016, when the club requested a vacant berth in LEB Plata that finally, the Spanish Basketball Federation granted them.

Sponsorship naming

Zamora CF 1978–1980
Zamora Citroën 1980–1981
Frinca Zamora 1981–1986
Riespri Zamora 1986–1987
Caja España Zamora 1987–1990
Arcos Zamora 1990–1992
Pan de Azúcar 1992–1993
Vino de Toro 1993–1996
Caja España Zamora 1996–2002
UFC Zamora 2002–2007
UFC INEC Zamora 2007–2008
Grupo INEC Zamora 2008–2011
Grupo INEC Queso Zamorano 2011–2015
HiLed Queso Zamorano 2015–2017
Aquimisa Laboratorios 2017–

Season by season

Source:

References

External links
Official Facebook account

Basketball teams in Castile and León
Basketball teams established in 1978
1978 establishments in Spain
Former Liga EBA teams
LEB Plata teams
Sport in Zamora, Spain